Manali Refinery is a complex and integrated oil refinery set up by Chennai Petroleum Corporation, operating in Chennai city in the state of Tamil Nadu since 1969. It is one of the oldest refineries in southern India. It has a capacity of 10.5 million tonnes per year and is one of the most complex refineries in India with fuel, lube, wax and petrochemical feedstocks production facilities. This refinery is designed to produce Lube oil based stocks in addition to Fuel products like Liquefied Petroleum Gas, Motor Spirit, High Speed Diesel, Superior Kerosene Oil, Aviation Turbine Fuel, Naphtha and Furnace Oil.

References

External links
 Manali Refinery
 CPCL Refining

Oil refineries in India
Companies based in Tamil Nadu
Chennai district
Indian Oil Corporation buildings and structures
1969 establishments in Tamil Nadu
Energy in Tamil Nadu
Energy infrastructure completed in 1969
20th-century architecture in India